The Casalecchio–Vignola railway  is an Italian railway connecting Casalecchio di Reno to Vignola, in Emilia-Romagna.

History 
For decades, the Casalecchio–Vignola railway was used only as a freight line. Passenger service was reinstated on 13 September 2003 from Casalecchio Garibaldi railway station to Bazzano, Valsamoggia; on 19 September 2004, passenger service was reinstated on the remaining part of the line, between Bazzano and Vignola.

Notes

Railway lines in Emilia-Romagna
Railway lines opened in 1938